Maryna Hrymych (born 1961) is a Ukrainian novelist and academician. Ph.D. in Philology and History (Candidate of Philology, Doctor of History). Editor in Chief of the Publishing House Duliby. Producer of the literary project Lyuba Klymenko. Member of the Writers Union of Ukraine, member of the Canadian Union of Ethnology.

Husband: Ihor Ostash, Member of the Ukrainian Parliament (1996–2006), Ambassador Extraordinary and Plenipotentiary of Ukraine to Canada (since 2006).

Life

Maryna Hrymych was born on April 4, 1961 in Kyiv. Father Will Hrymych, translator, Member of the Writers Union of Ukraine, mother Halyna Hrymych, Professor of the Taras Shevchenko National University of Kyiv.
In 1983 Maryna Hrymych graduated from Taras Shevchenko National University of Kyiv, Department of Philology, Chair of Slavonic Studies.
In 1990 she obtained Ph.D. in Philology (Candidate Ph.D.) from the Institute of Art History, Folkloristics and Ethnography of the Academy of Sciences of the Ukrainian Soviet Social Republic.
In 1991-1995 worked as an Academic Secretary and Deputy Head of the International School of Ukrainian Studies at the National Academy of Sciences of Ukraine.
Between 1996 and 2006 she is Associate Professor and later Professor of the Taras Shevchenko National University of Kyiv, Department of History. In 2001-2006 Hrymych chairs Ethnology and Regional Studies of the Department.
In 2004 obtained her Ph.D. in History (Doctorate Ph.D.).
Married to Ihor Ostash and has two children.

Novels and Translations 

As a student Hrymych published her first translations from Slovenian, Serbian-Croat and Macedonian languages. At this time appear as well her first poems in Dnipro and Zhovten literary magazines. Since 2000 works as a novelist and essay writer.

Maryna Hrymych is a versatile author of 8 novels, two book translations, and a number of essays.

She is a prize-winner of the All-Ukrainian Literary Competition Koronatsiya Slova (special awards in 2000, 2001, first prize in 2002 for novel Egoist).

Since 2004 Member of the Writers Union of Ukraine.

Academic career 

Started her academic career as an ethnographer and folklorist at the M. T. Rylskyi Institute of Art History, Folkloristics and Ethnography of the Academy of Sciences of the USSR. During her work at the International School of Ukrainian Studies developed methodology for teaching Ukrainian as a foreign language. At the Department of History of the Taras Shevchenko National University of Kyiv she taught ethnology and social anthropology. Her cross-disciplinary Ph.D. thesis (Doctorate Ph.D.) on customary law relates to three scientific fields – ethnology, history and law.

Hrymych is an experienced field-worker – conducted ethnological and anthropological field work throughout Ukraine and in a number of other countries.

Author of 2 monographs, 2 manuals and a great number of scientific articles and papers.

Awarded Taras Shevchenko Award (Taras Shevchenko National University of Kyiv) for her monograph Property Institution in the Customary Law Culture of the Ukrainians in the 19th and beginning of the 20th centuries (2004).

Member of the Canadian Union of Ethnology (since 2007).

Publishing 
In 2004 founded and took the lead of the publishing house Duliby specializing in modern Ukrainian literature and scientific works of ethnological character. In 2004 and 2005 Duliby was awarded a number of prizes of the Lviv Publishers Forum.

Bibliography

Novels 
Do You Hear, Margo? (Ти чуєш, Марго?, 2000) - Prize of the All-Ukrainian Literary Competition Koronatsiya Slova
Bartholomew’s Night (Варфоломієва ніч, 2002) - Prize of the All-Ukrainian Literary Competition Koronatsiya Slova
Magdalynky (Магдалинки, 2003)
Egoist (Еґоїст, 2003) – First Prize of the All-Ukrainian Literary Competition Koronatsiya Slova
Red Poppy in the Dew (Мак червоний в росі, 2005)
Frida (Фріда, 2006)
White Owl Island (Острів білої сови, 2010)
Second Life (Second Life (Друге життя), 2010)
Letyuchiy Smittyevoz (Летючий Сміттевоз, 2016)

Scientific works 

Traditional Worldview and Ethno-Psychological Constants of the Ukrainians (Cognitive Anthropology) (Традиційний світогляд та етнопсихологічні константи українців (Когнітивна антропологія), 2000)
Property Institution in the Customary Law Culture of the Ukrainians in the 19th – beginning of the 20th centuries (Інститут власності у звичаєво-правовій культурі українців ХІХ - початку ХХ ст., 2004) - Taras Shevchenko Award, 2005 (Taras Shevchenko National University of Kyiv), 5th place in the category ‘Foretime’ of the All-Ukrainian Ranking Book of the Year, 2004
Customary Law of the Ukrainians in the 19th – beginning of the 20th centuries: Second, Revised Edition (Звичаєве право українців ХІХ — початку ХХ ст.: 2 видання, доповнене, 2006)

Further reading 
Encyclopaedia of Modern Ukraine. Vol. 6. (Енциклопедія Сучасної України. T 6, 2006)
Ukrainian Writers: Bibliographical Tool (Письменники України : Бібліографічний довідник, 2006).
Department of History of Taras Shevchenko National University of Kyiv: the Past and the Present (1834–2004) (Історичний факультет Київського національного університету імені Тараса Шевченка: минуле й сьогодення (1834—2004 рр.), 2004).
Vorobyova, T. Gender Aspect of the Repetition of the Genre Canons in the Ukrainian Popular Novels (Basing on the Novels Egoist by M. Hrymych and Woman with Sword by L. Demska) // Current Issues of  Slavonic Philology (Воробйова Т. В. Гендерний аспект наслідування жанрових канонів в українському жіночому масовому романі (на матеріалі романів М. Гримич «Егоїст» та Л. Демської «Жінка з мечем» // Актуальні проблеми слов'янської філології. Вип. 11, Ч. 2, 2006).
Herasymenko, N. What Stands Behind Business of a Literary Text? Or Once More About Psychotherapeutic Fiction on the Example of Novelism of One of the Modern Writers: Novels by Maryna Hrymych // Literary Ukraine (Що за комерційністю літературного тексту? або Ще раз про психотерапевтичну белетристику на прикладі творчості одного із сучасних авторів: (Романи Марини Гримич) // Літературна Україна.  № 38, 2008).
Dolzhenkova, I. In the Maze of the House-Tree // The Mirror of the Week (Долженкова І. У лабіринтах дому-древа // Дзеркало тижня. № 32, 2006).

References

External links
National Writers Union of Ukraine
Maryna Hrymych web-page on avtura.com.ua
Chief Editor’s page on the Duliby web-site
Full list of the scientific works by Maryna Hrymych

Maryna Hrymych novels on the BBC Book of the Year – 2010 
Second life
White Owl Island

Living people
Ukrainian women novelists
Academic staff of the Taras Shevchenko National University of Kyiv
1961 births